Vijaya College is a college in Mulki in Dakshina Kannada district.  The college is affiliated to Mangalore University.  It is managed by Academy of Higher Education, Manipal.

External links
Vijaya College

Manipal Academy of Higher Education
Universities and colleges in Dakshina Kannada district
Colleges in Karnataka
Educational institutions in India with year of establishment missing
Colleges of Mangalore University